Kasu Venkata Krishna Reddy (born 28 September 1947) is an Indian politician. He was a minister in Nallari Kiran Kumar Reddy's government.

Personal life
He is the son of Kasu Vengala Reddy and nephew of Kasu Brahmananda Reddy, a former Chief Minister of Andhra Pradesh.

Career
Krishna Reddy has been a Member of the Legislative Assembly from Narasaraopet in the Guntur district, Andhra Pradesh. Kasu Krishna Reddy was elected MP twice from Narasaraopet (Lok Sabha constituency) (1989, 1991) and MLA thrice from Narasaraopet (Assembly constituency)(1978, 2004, 2009). He was minister in the cabinets of T Anjaiah, YS Rajasekhar Reddy and N Kirankumar Reddy.

See also

 List of people from Andhra Pradesh
 List of United Progressive Alliance candidates in the Indian general election, 2014

References

Place of birth missing (living people)
Telugu politicians
State cabinet ministers of Andhra Pradesh
Members of the Andhra Pradesh Legislative Assembly
People from Guntur district
United Progressive Alliance candidates in the 2014 Indian general election
Living people
Indian National Congress politicians
India MPs 1989–1991
India MPs 1991–1996
Lok Sabha members from Andhra Pradesh
1947 births
Indian National Congress politicians from Andhra Pradesh